Alexandre-François Debain (6 July 1809 – 3 December 1877) was a French inventor who developed the harmonium. He made a new action system, in which, when depressing a note on the keyboard, a valve opened thereby emitting sound from the instrument.  He patented it in Paris in 1842.

Notes

External links 
 Harmonicord by Alexandre Debain, Paris ca. 1854-55 (The Piano in Polish Collections)

French musical instrument makers
1809 births
1877 deaths
Place of birth missing